James Richard Fouts (born August 8, 1942) is an American politician serving as the mayor of Warren, Michigan since 2007.

Personal life 
Fouts grew up in Hazel Park, Michigan, where his father served as the city assessor, and later as city manager. Prior to election to public office, he spent his career as an educator, teaching government, political science, and psychology in the Warren Consolidated School District. His last teaching position was at Sterling Heights High School, where he taught for about ten years.

Early political career 
In 1976, Fouts ran as a Republican for the Michigan state house of representatives in the 70th District. Fouts was elected to the Warren City Council in 1981, where he served for 26 years. During his tenure, he initiated several anti-tobacco proposals.

In 2007, Mark Steenbergh had reached the term limit as mayor of Warren and did not seek re-election. Fouts ran against City Clerk Richard Sulaka for the open seat and won 62% to 38%. In the 2007 campaign, finance reports show that Sulaka outspent Fouts $332,000 to $225,000. Sulaka described Fouts as a "maverick" and attributed his victory to voters seeking an alternative to the previous administration. The election also saw Warren citizens electing a new clerk, new treasurer, and a majority of new council members.

Mayoral tenure

His enforcement of local building codes led to the demolition of dilapidated buildings and the promotion of neighborhood "clean sweeps" by city inspectors and was touted as a model for other mayors.

In response to the challenges facing the automotive industry, an industry which employs many Warren residents, he initiated a "Buy American Products" policy for automotive purchases by heads of city departments.

In 2009, Fouts tried to convince General Motors to relocate its headquarters from Detroit to Warren.

His 2011 re-election campaign was endorsed by the Detroit Free Press who said the campaign had become "way too focused on legal battles over Fouts' age" which became an issue when his opponents filed suit to remove him from the ballot because he had refused to place his age on the candidacy form. He won the lawsuit and the election with more than 80% of the vote against City Councilwoman Kathy Vogt.

In 2012, he acted to ban smoking within 100 feet of any city building without legislative approval, but the court said he did not have the authority and had the "No Smoking" signs removed. Fouts brought the measure back to the city council, after they had tabled it in September.

In July 2014, Fouts personally denied permission to establish an irreligious "Reason Booth" at Warren City Hall, as a counterpoint to a "Prayer Booth" that was established in the city hall's atrium by a local Pentecostal church in 2009. The resident denied permission, Douglas Marshall, filed a federal lawsuit against both the city and Fouts. Represented by the American Civil Liberties Union, Americans United for Separation of Church and State, and Freedom From Religion Foundation, Marshall's lawsuit was based on the First Amendment rights to free speech and a violation of the Establishment Clause. The defendants failed to respond to the lawsuit, and in 2015 the federal court ordered that the reason station "be allowed to operate on terms not less favorable than the terms granted to the 'Prayer Station' currently allowed in the atrium space" and entered a $100,000 judgment against the city and Fouts for costs, damages and attorney fees.

In 2014, Fouts sued to invalidate 2014 Proposal 1, a voter-approved referendum that eliminated the Michigan personal property tax for businesses (which applies to industrial machinery and office equipment) and replaced it with an Internet sales tax. Fouts alleged that the ballot wording was biased. The Michigan Court of Claims declined to invalidate the ballot initiative, and Fouts ultimately dropped an appeal.

In March 2016, Fouts claimed that he was asked by security at the Democratic presidential debate in Flint to refrain from showing excessive enthusiasm for Bernie Sanders.

In November 2016, Fouts accused Macomb County Executive Mark Hackel of a coverup of illegal dumping. In response, Hackel provided a series of audio recordings to the media, that he claimed to have received from unidentified sources, allegedly of Fouts making derogatory comments. These lead to calls for Fouts's resignation. Fouts claimed that the recordings were manufactured and manipulated. In a post on Facebook, Fouts declared his intention to remain in office through to the end of his term in 2019.

In late 2017, amid the heroin epidemic, Fouts and Warren Police Commissioner Jim Dwyer created a program to offer rewards to residents of the city who give confidential tips to police informing on suspected drug deals.

In April 2020, Fouts directed the Warren Police to not enforce the provision of Governor Gretchen Whitmer's executive order on COVID-19 banning commercial lawn services. Fouts stated the lack of lawn maintenance would lead to higher numbers of mosquitoes and rodents and be a health hazard and that it is an essential service.

Elections
First term: In November 2007 Fouts won election as Mayor of Warren with 62% of the total votes cast.

Second Term: In November 2011 Fouts won re-election as Mayor of Warren with 81% of the total votes cast.

Third Term: In November 2015 Fouts won re-election again as Mayor of Warren with 85% of the total votes cast.

Fourth Term: In November 2019 Fouts was reelected to a historic 4th term with 57.5% of the total votes cast.

References

1942 births
Living people
Mayors of Warren, Michigan
Michigan city council members
Michigan Independents
People from Hazel Park, Michigan
Educators from Michigan
20th-century American politicians
21st-century American politicians